Tuesday Morning...Somewhere is a Canadian short drama film, directed by Hélène Bélanger Martin and released in 2005. The film centres on the constantly changing environment of a public transit bus, as passengers board and interact and disembark.

The film premiered in 2005 at the Festival International de Films de Montréal. It received a Genie Award nomination for Best Live Action Short Drama at the 26th Genie Awards in 2006. It won the Prix Coup de cœur at the 2006 Rendez-vous Québec Cinéma.

References

External links
 

2005 films
2005 short films
2005 drama films
French-language Canadian films
Canadian drama short films
2000s Canadian films